Quercus porphyrogenita is a species of oak in the family Fagaceae, native to northeastern Mexico.

Taxonomy
Quercus porphyrogenita was first described by William Trelease in 1924. It may be treated as a synonym of Quercus laceyi, but , is accepted by Plants of the World Online. Under the synonym Q. laceyi, it is placed in Quercus section Quercus.

Distribution
Quercus porphyrogenita is native to northeastern Mexico – the states of Nuevo León and Tamaulipas.

References

porphyrogenita
Flora of Northeastern Mexico
Plants described in 1924
Taxa named by William Trelease